Srdečný pozdrav ze zeměkoule (A Heartfelt Greeting from Earth) is a 1982 Czechoslovak comedy science fiction film directed by Oldřich Lipský. This is the only live action film to be done in Kratky Film Praha under the Bratři v triku mark.

External links
 

1983 films
1980s science fiction comedy films
1980s Czech-language films
Czechoslovak science fiction comedy films
Films directed by Oldřich Lipský
Czech science fiction comedy films
1983 comedy films
1980s Czech films
Czech parody films